Jagananna Gorumudda is a welfare program launched by the Government of Andhra Pradesh to improve the nutrition of students by providing quality nutritious food modifying the menu of mid day meal scheme.

Development 
Jagananna Gorumudda was launched by Chief minister of Andhra Pradesh Y. S. Jagan Mohan Reddy on 21 January 2020 with a budget of ₹974 crore. Students from 45,854 government and aided schools were benefited by the scheme with the government spending a total amount of ₹1600 crore as of May, 2021. Department of School Education has launched a mobile app to monitor and foresee the scheme's functioning.

The scheme 
Jagananna Gorumudda was launched to upgrade the existing Midday Meal Scheme by providing more nutritious food by updating the previous food menu.

References 

Government welfare schemes in Andhra Pradesh
Child welfare in India